Mike Campbell (born September 19, 1965) was a defensive end who played ten seasons in the Canadian Football League, winning a Grey Cup and CFL All-Star selection in 1991 whilst playing for Toronto Argonauts.

References

1965 births
Living people
Canadian football defensive linemen
Hamilton Tiger-Cats players
Players of Canadian football from Ontario
Slippery Rock football players
Sportspeople from North York
Canadian football people from Toronto
Toronto Argonauts players